Paul Sauter (born 14 June 1947) is a retired German football manager.

References

1947 births
Living people
German football managers
SSV Ulm 1846 managers
FC Augsburg managers
Stuttgarter Kickers managers
German expatriate football managers
Expatriate football managers in Togo